Baghramyan is a village in the Artashat Municipality of the Ararat Province of Armenia. It is named after the Soviet Armenian military commander and Marshal of the Soviet Union Hovhannes Baghramyan.

Notable people
 Arayik Mirzoyan, European silver medalist in weightlifting

References 

World Gazeteer: Armenia – World-Gazetteer.com

Populated places in Ararat Province
Yazidi populated places in Armenia